Pinewood Estates is an unincorporated community and census-designated place (CDP) in Hardin County, Texas, United States. The population was 1,678 at the 2010 census. It is part of the Beaumont–Port Arthur Metropolitan Statistical Area.

Geography
Pinewood Estates is located in southern Hardin County at  (30.154468, -94.320469). Texas State Highway 105 forms the southern boundary of the community, leading east  to the U.S. Route 69 freeway in northern Beaumont and west  to Sour Lake.

Demographics
As of the census of 2000, there were 1,633 people, 528 households, and 482 families residing in the CDP. The population density was 123.5 people per square mile (47.7/km2). There were 539 housing units at an average density of 40.8/sq mi (15.7/km2). The racial makeup of the CDP was 97.43% White, 0.37% African American, 0.43% Native American, 0.37% Asian, 0.55% from other races, and 0.86% from two or more races. Hispanic or Latino of any race were 3.25% of the population.

There were 528 households, out of which 46.4% had children under the age of 18 living with them, 84.1% were married couples living together, 5.1% had a female householder with no husband present, and 8.7% were non-families. 8.0% of all households were made up of individuals, and 4.2% had someone living alone who was 65 years of age or older. The average household size was 3.09 and the average family size was 3.27.

In the CDP, the population was spread out, with 28.4% under the age of 18, 8.6% from 18 to 24, 24.7% from 25 to 44, 30.4% from 45 to 64, and 8.0% who were 65 years of age or older. The median age was 41 years. For every 100 females, there were 103.9 males. For every 100 females age 18 and over, there were 100.3 males.

The median income for a household in the CDP was $72,917, and the median income for a family was $78,497. Males had a median income of $61,429 versus $31,985 for females. The per capita income for the CDP was $28,350. None of the population or families were below the poverty line.

Education
Pinewood Estates is served by the Hardin-Jefferson Independent School District.

References

Census-designated places in Hardin County, Texas
Census-designated places in Texas
Beaumont–Port Arthur metropolitan area